Flanders Field can refer to:

Flanders Fields, the name of World War I battlefields in the medieval County of Flanders, which spans southern Belgium and north-west France.
Flanders Field American Cemetery and Memorial, a World War I cemetery on the southeast edge of the town of Waregem, Belgium. Poppy flowers began to grow after the burial of the fallen soldiers.

See also
In Flanders Fields (disambiguation)